Sayyid Ahmad Khatami (born 8 May 1960) is a senior Iranian  Shia cleric, member of Guardian Council and a senior member of the Assembly of Experts. In December 2005, Ali Khamenei appointed him as Tehran’s substitute Friday prayer leader. He is also a conservative and principlist politician.

He was born in the city of Semnan, Iran. He studied at seminaries in Qom and Semnan.

In 2006, during the Pope Benedict XVI Islam controversy, Khatami asked the Pope to "fall on his knees in front of a senior Muslim cleric and try to understand Islam." In 2007, he addressed the death sentence issued by Imam Khomeini against Salman Rushdie, saying "In the Islamic Iran that revolutionary fatwa of Imam [Khomeini] is still alive and cannot be changed." In regard to the 2009 Iranian election protests, Khatami denounced demonstrators as rioters who wage war against God ("mohareb"), (a capital crime in Islamic law), and more recently accused reformist presidential candidates Mir Hossein Mousavi and Mehdi Karroubi of Mohareb as "leaders of sedition."

See also 

 Khamenei
 Emami-Kashani
 Aboutorabi Fard
 Movahedi-Kermani
 Haj Ali Akbari
 Friday prayer

References

External links

Iranian ayatollahs
Living people
Members of the Assembly of Experts
1960 births
People from Semnan, Iran
Society of Seminary Teachers of Qom members